Betty Tuvén (born 30 May 1928 in Gothenburg - died 17 June 1999 in Stockholm) was a Swedish actress. She was engaged at Gothenburg City Theatre.

Selected filmography
1996 - Anna Holt (TV)
1973 - Den vita stenen (TV)
1968 - Badarna

References

External links

People from Gothenburg
1928 births
1999 deaths
20th-century Swedish actresses